Stenoptilia kurushensis is a moth of the family Pterophoridae. It is found in Daghestan, Russia.

References

Moths described in 2001
kurushensis
Moths of Europe